Herdmanflat Hospital was a psychiatric hospital in Aberlady Road, Haddington, Scotland. It was operated by NHS Lothian.

History
The hospital was located at a site which was once known as Herdmanflat Farm. The facility was designed by Peddie and Kinnear and opened as the East Lothian District Asylum in 1866. A dining hall was added in 1890 and several villas were added in 1908. It joined the National Health Service in 1948.

After the Garleton Unit at Herdmanflat Hospital had been upgraded at a cost of £250,000, mental health services transferred from Edenhall Hospital in Musselburgh. This created a "one-stop shop for older people's mental health services" for the whole of East Lothian at Herdmanflat Hospital.

In 2014 NHS Lothian proposed creating a community hospital on the site of the old Roodlands General Hospital. After all services moved to the new East Lothian Community Hospital, the Herdmanflat Hospital closed in 2020.

References 

Buildings and structures in East Lothian
NHS Scotland hospitals
NHS Lothian
Psychiatric hospitals in Scotland
Haddington, East Lothian